Orion the Hunter was a 1980s rock combo and offshoot of the popular band Boston. It featured former Boston members Barry Goudreau on guitars and Brad Delp on backing vocals, as well as future Boston lead vocalist Fran Cosmo.

The band was originally known as simply "Orion", but the name was changed to "Orion the Hunter" in deference to pressure from Orion Pictures. The group's self-titled album in 1984 on Portrait/CBS Records, which yielded a hit single "So You Ran," featured the sky-high vocals which prompted Cosmo's entrance to Boston in the early 1990s.

Orion the Hunter charted at #57 on Billboard's Top 200 Albums chart after its debut on May 9, 1984. "So You Ran" made the Top Ten on rock radio and was a mid-chart hit on mainstream pop radio.

Orion the Hunter featured Bruce Smith on bass and ex-Heart drummer Michael DeRosier. The album also included Brad Delp, former lead singer of Boston, who co-wrote four songs and sang background vocals on numerous tracks. Delp's vocals are especially noticeable on the ballad "Joanne" which he co-wrote with Fran Cosmo.

Discography
Orion the Hunter (Portrait, 1984)
"So You Ran" (single), Billboard Hot 100 peak position #58, (Portrait/Epic), July 1984
The Lost Demos of Cosmo/Smith: demos recorded by Cosmo and Smith for the 2nd Orion album, which was never released. Four songs were uploaded to FranCosmoMusic's YouTube channel.

Personnel

Band
 Fran Cosmo: Lead vocals, guitar
 Barry Goudreau: Lead and rhythm guitars, vocals
 Bruce Smith: Bass, vocals
 Michael DeRosier: Drums

Additional musicians
 Brad Delp: Backing Vocals
 Brian Maes (touring only):  Keyboards, Backing Vocals
 Steve Baker (studio only): Grand Piano
 John Schuller (studio only): Organ, Mellotron, Oberheim synthesizer

Notes 

Portrait Records artists
American hard rock musical groups
Boston (band)